Dorothy Ursula Cundall (1882 – 8 February 1954) was an English badminton player. Born in 1882 in Richmond, London she was a prominent player before the First World War winning three All England titles. In 1912 she married Douglas Harvey (who died in 1917). Cundall played as Mrs Harvey afterwards.

In 1922 she remarried to Bert Bisgood, a prominent Somerset cricketer who also represented Ireland at badminton.
 She died in Bournemouth on 8 February 1954.

She had two children, Ian Harvey, a Conservative MP, and Jeanne Bisgood, an English international golfer.

Medal Record at the All England Badminton Championships

References

1882 births
1954 deaths
English female badminton players